Yu Deuk-gong (1749–1807) was a Korean scholar during the Joseon Dynasty.  He is remembered today for his work in recovering the history of Balhae, which had not generally been considered part of Korean history before his time.

See also
History of Korea
List of Koreans
Balhaego

References
Yu, Deuk-gong.  "Yu Tŭkkong:  Parhae in Korean history," pp. 186–187 in

External links
Dusan Encyclopedia article, in Korean

18th-century Korean poets
Historians of Korea
1749 births
1807 deaths